John Henderson Whitehead (April 27, 1909 – October 20, 1964) was an American Major League Baseball pitcher with the Chicago White Sox and St. Louis Browns between 1935 and 1942. Whitehead batted and threw right-handed. He was born in Coleman, Texas.

References

External links

1909 births
1964 deaths
Major League Baseball pitchers
Baseball players from Texas
Chicago White Sox players
St. Louis Browns players
People from Coleman, Texas